Thomas Hopkins Gallaudet (December 10, 1787 – September 10, 1851) was an American educator. Along with Laurent Clerc and Mason Cogswell, he co-founded the first permanent institution for the education of the deaf in North America, and he became its first principal. When opened on April 15, 1817, it was called the "Connecticut Asylum (at Hartford) for the Education and Instruction of Deaf and Dumb Persons," but it is now known as the American School for the Deaf.

Biography

He attended Yale University, earning his bachelor's degree in 1805, graduating at the age of seventeen, with highest honors, and then earned a master's degree at Yale in 1808. He engaged in many things such as studying law, trade, and theology. In 1814, Gallaudet graduated from Andover Theological Seminary after a two-year course of study.  However, he declined several offers of pastorates, due to ongoing concerns about his health.

His path in life was altered when he met Alice Cogswell, on May 25, 1814, the nine-year-old deaf daughter of a neighbor, Dr. Mason Cogswell. Gallaudet had returned to his parents' home in Hartford to recuperate from his seminary studies.  On that day, as he observed Alice playing apart from other children, he wanted to teach her. Gallaudet started to teach Alice what different objects were called by writing their names and drawing pictures of them with a stick in the dirt. Dr. Cogswell was impressed and invited Gallaudet to continue teaching Alice through the summer.  While many of his friends became pastors or found mission fields overseas, Gallaudet found his mission field at home.  The next year Cogswell, with several businessmen and clergy, asked Gallaudet to travel to Europe to study methods for teaching deaf students, especially those of the Braidwood family in Scotland. Gallaudet found the Braidwoods unwilling to share knowledge of their oral communication method and himself financially limited. At the same time, he also was not satisfied that the oral method produced desirable results.

While still in Great Britain, he met Abbé Sicard, head of the Institution Nationale des Sourds-Muets à Paris, and two of its deaf faculty members, Laurent Clerc and Jean Massieu. Sicard invited Gallaudet to Paris to study the school's method of teaching the deaf using manual communication. Impressed with the manual method, Gallaudet studied teaching methodology under Sicard, learning sign language from Massieu and Clerc, who were both highly educated graduates of the school.

Having persuaded Clerc to accompany him, Gallaudet sailed back to America. The two men, with the help of Dr. Cogswell, toured New England and successfully raised private and public funds to fund a school for deaf students in Hartford, which later became known as the American School for the Deaf (ASD), in 1817. Young Alice was one of the first seven students at ASD.

In 1821, he married one of his former students, Sophia Fowler and they had 8 children together.

After resigning directorship of his school for the deaf in 1830, Gallaudet wrote educational and religious texts, became the chaplain to the Connecticut Retreat for the Insane in 1838, and taught in Hartford; the young Frederic Edwin Church was a notable pupil during this period.

Thomas Hopkins Gallaudet died in Hartford on September 10, 1851, aged 63, and was buried in Hartford's Cedar Hill Cemetery.

Family
His youngest child Edward Miner Gallaudet (1837–1917) founded in 1864 the first college for the deaf, which, in 1986, became Gallaudet University.  He was president for 46 years. The university also offers education for those in elementary, middle, and high school. The elementary school on the Gallaudet University Campus is named the Kendall Demonstration Elementary School (KDES); the middle and high school is the Model Secondary School for the Deaf (MSSD). he went to France with Dr Mason Cogwell.

Gallaudet had another son, Thomas Gallaudet, who became an Episcopal priest and also worked for the deaf.

Gallaudet's father, Peter Wallace Gallaudet, was a personal secretary to US President George Washington, when the office of the President was located in Philadelphia.

Thomas Hopkins Gallaudet was the eldest of 13 children. His younger siblings' names were: Edgar (1789–90), Charles (1792–1830), (unnamed twins, 1793), Catherine (1793–1856), James (1796–1878), William Edgar (1797–1821), Ann Watts (1800–50), Jane (1801–35), Theodore (1805–85), Edward (1808–47) , and Wallace (1811–16). William Edgar Gallaudet graduated from Yale with a B.A. in 1815.

Legacy 

Just days before his death, Gallaudet received an honorary Doctor of Laws degree from the Western Reserve College of Ohio.
Gallaudet University was named in honor of him in 1894.
A statue of Thomas Hopkins Gallaudet and Alice Cogswell created by Daniel Chester French sits at the front of Gallaudet University.
A memorial honoring the 100th anniversary of Thomas Hopkins Gallaudet's birth was erected in 1887 at the American School for the Deaf.
A Great Americans series 20¢ postage stamp was issued by the United States Postal Service in June 1983 to honor him.
Gallaudet Hall, a residence hall at Central Connecticut State University in New Britain is named in his honor
A residence hall named in his honor at the University of Hartford in West Hartford

References

Notes

Citations

Sources

 

 

 
 Gallaudet, Edward Miner. Letter to J.H. McFarlane (undated). Published in Deaf-Mutes' Journal, vol. 51, no. 46 (November 16, 1922), p. 2.
 Gallaudet, Thomas Hopkins. 1844. Letter to Horace Mann. Quoted in Heman Humphrey. 1857. The Life and Labors of the Rev. T.H. Gallaudet, LL.D., New York: Robert Carter & Brothers, pp. 209–212.

External links

 Photographs of Thomas Hopkins Gallaudet statue at Gallaudet University
 A Sermon Delivered at the Opening of the Connecticut Asylum for the Education and Instruction of Deaf and Dumb Persons. Hartford: Hudson & Co., 1817.
 An Elementary Book for the Use of the Deaf and Dumb in the Connecticut Asylum. Hartford: Hudson & Co., 1817.
 A Discourse, Delivered at the Dedication of the American Asylum for the Education of Deaf and Dumb Persons. Hartford: Hudson & Co., 1821.
 Plan of a Seminary for the Education of Instructers of Youth,  Boston: Cummings, Hilliard and Co., 1825.
 An Address on Female Education, November 21, 1827.
A Statement with Regard to the Moorish Prince, Abduhl Rahhahman. New York: D. Fanshaw, 1828.
 The Child's Picture Defining and Reading Book, Hartford, CT: H. & F.J. Huntington, 1830.
 The Mother's Primer, To Teach Her Child Its Letters, And How To Read. Designed Also For The Lowest Class In Primary Schools. On A New Plan, Second edition, Hartford, CT: Daniel Burgess & Co., 1836.

1787 births
1851 deaths
Burials at Cedar Hill Cemetery (Hartford, Connecticut)
Deaf culture in the United States
Educators from Hartford, Connecticut
Educators from Philadelphia
Gallaudet University
Special education in the United States
Yale University alumni
19th-century American educators
Educators of the deaf